Wheelz may refer to:

 Aaron Fotheringham, extreme wheelchair athlete
 WILZ (104.5 FM), a radio station in Michigan
 Wheelz, a company acquired by carsharing company RelayRides